The brown jay (Psilorhinus morio) is a large American jay which has the habitus of a magpie, but is slightly smaller and with a shorter tail, though the bill is larger.

It occurs from Mexico south into Central America on the Gulf slope. The northernmost extent of the bird is in the Rio Grande Valley of Texas.

Description

Brown jays vary in plumage geographically: there are two main groups. Northern birds are almost completely dark brown, with lighter brown on the underparts. Southern birds are white-bellied and have bright white tips to the outer tail feathers. The intergrade zone is in Veracruz, Mexico.

Adults in both populations have black bills, legs, and feet. Immatures have yellow bare parts, including yellow eye-rings.

The voice is a loud but low-pitched pee-ah call and is often modified to suit its situation or mood.

Ecology
Food is sought largely in trees but brown jays also take some food from the ground.  They are rather indiscriminate feeders. Insects and a wide range of other invertebrates are taken, also lizards, nectar, and fruit (e.g. that of Trophis racemosa (Moraceae)). Though they will take eggs and nestlings, they appear not to if there is plenty of other food available.

The nest is built in a tree or large shrub with both sexes helping in construction. There are normally three eggs laid but six is not unusual. Incubation is between 18 and 20 days. Only the female broods but the male feeds her while doing so.

Sometimes the offspring from a previous season will help in raising the chicks. If a helper bird returns with food, it will give it to one of the resident parents to feed the chicks.

Range
In Central America, the brown jay is not found in El Salvador.

References

Further reading

External links

 
 
 

brown jay
Birds of the Rio Grande valleys
Birds of Mexico
Birds of Central America
Birds of the Yucatán Peninsula
Birds of Belize
Birds of Guatemala

brown jay
Taxobox binomials not recognized by IUCN